Center of Mathematical Sciences (CMS), is a renowned mathematical research center based in China. It belongs to the Zhejiang University in Hangzhou, Zhejiang.

Introduction
The center was mainly founded by the Fields Medalist Shing-Tung Yau in August 2002. The first directors and advisors were mathematicians Su Buqing and Shiing-Shen Chern, both of whom are Zhejiang natives. The first academic director of the center is Shing-Tung Yau.

In China, Zhejiang University has one of the best traditions of mathematical research, which is known as the Zhe School (of Mathematics) and the Chen-Su School (of Differential Geometry; in memorial of mathematicians Su Buqing and Chen Jiangong). For continuing keeping and developing such excellent tradition, the center was founded, and coupled with the Department of Mathematics of Zhejiang University.

Every year, many mathematicians and scientists from all over the world visit or do research at the center.

Notable people
The institute holds tens of permanent researcher positions or professorships. Many mathematicians from all over the world have worked in or visited the institute:

References

External links
 Center of Mathematical Sciences, Zhejiang University

Research Center of Zhejiang University
Mathematical institutes